USS Kenosha (AK-190) was an  that served the US Navy during the clean-up phase of World War II. When her service was no longer required in 1946, she was decommissioned and returned to the U.S. Maritime Commission where she was sold to the Kingdom of Norway in 1947.

Construction
Kenosha was launched 25 August 1944, by Walter Butler Shipbuilding Co., Superior, Wisconsin, under a U.S. Maritime Commission contract, MC hull 2121; sponsored by Miss Marion Crowley; acquired by the Navy 1 August 1945; and commissioned 7 September 1945.

Service history

World War II-related service
After shakedown out of Galveston, Texas, Kenosha arrived Gulfport, Mississippi, 19 October to load cargo for the Mariana Islands. The cargo ship departed Gulfport 25 November, cleared the Panama Canal, and arrived Guam via Pearl Harbor 10 January 1946.

Upon discharging her cargo, she loaded cargo for the US Marines and sailed for the US East Coast, arriving Lynnhaven Roads, Virginia, 7 March.

Decommissioning
On 3 April Kenosha arrived Baltimore, Maryland, and decommissioned there 16 April 1946.

Merchant history
She was sold to Norway on 4 March 1947, for $693,862, and renamed Rio Dale. She was renamed several times between 1958 and 1967, Torian in 1959, Lars Viking in 1963, Neptune V in 1965, and finally Arabdrill 2 in 1967, when she converted to an offshore drilling ship. She was scrapped on 24 May 1984 at Gadani beach.

Honors and awards
Qualified Kenosha personnel were eligible for the following:
 American Campaign Medal
 Asiatic-Pacific Campaign Medal
 World War II Victory Medal

Notes 

Citations

Bibliography

External links

 

Alamosa-class cargo ships
Kenosha County, Wisconsin
Ships built in Superior, Wisconsin
1944 ships
World War II auxiliary ships of the United States